Sassi Punno is a 2004 Pakistani film in the Urdu language. It was directed by Hassan Askari.

Plot
The story is about a love triangle between character portrayed by Moammar Rana, Sana Nawaz and Veena Malik. The film is based on one of the four popular tragic romances of Sindh, Pakistan. Sassi Punnu folk tale was originally written by the Sindhi Sufi poet, Shah Abdul Latif Bhittai (1689-1752). Many movies have been made based on this folk tale in the past. This film is one of them.

Veena Malik is in love with Moammar Rana, while he loves Sana. Veena Malik's father tries to end this relationship for his daughter's sake. Moammar and Sana are locked up when they try to escape and suffer for each other.

Film performance
The film was financially unsuccessful, especially in Lahore.

Cast and crew
 Moammar Rana
 Sana
 Saud
 Veena Malik
 Safqat Cheema
 Rashid Mehmood

Music composer was M. Arshad, film song lyrics by Riaz ur Rehman Saghar. Playback singers were Naseebo Lal, Saira Nasim, Ameer Ali.

References

External links 
 

2000s Urdu-language films
2004 films
Films based on folklore
2000s historical drama films
Pakistani historical drama films